Palestine competed in the 2018 Asian Games in Jakarta and Palembang, Indonesia from 18 August to 2 September 2018. Palestine have competed in the Asian Games since 1994 with only one entrant and won their first medal in 2002 Busan with a bronze in boxing. This event marks the eight Asian Games appearance for Palestine.

Competitors 
The following is a list of the number of competitors representing Palestine that participated at the Games:

Athletics 

Palestine entered three athletes (2 men's and 1 women) to participate in the athletics competition at the Games.

Football 

Palestine participated in the men's team event at the 2018 Asian Games in Group A of the tournament.

Summary

Men's tournament 

The draw for the men's football event was held on 5 July 2018 initially with involving 24 teams. The teams seeded into four pots with six teams each classified in those pots. However the initial draw was scratched due to the omission of both UAE and Palestine due to the by mistakes of the game organisers. It was early proved that both of the football associations of Palestine and United Arab Emirates correctly submitted their participation form on time before the deadline. Due to these errors, the tournament's draw result was rescheduled and reconfirmed on 25 July 2018 with Palestine added to the Group A alongside hosts Indonesia and UAE was added to Group E.

However another redraw was held again for the men's football team event on 3 August 2018 due to the sudden withdrawal of Iraq national football team and it was decided to move either UAE or Palestine to Group C.

Roster

Group A

Round of 16

Ju-jitsu 

Palestine entered the ju-jitsu competition with 3 men's athletes.

Men

Judo 

Men

Karate 

Palestine participated in the karate competition at the Games with four men's athletes.

Kurash 

Men

Swimming

Men

Women

Taekwondo 

Kyorugi

Triathlon 

Individual

Volleyball

Beach volleyball

Weightlifting

Men

Wrestling 

Palestine put up two men's wrestler competed in the freestyle event at the Games.

Men's freestyle

See also 
 Palestine at the 2017 Asian Indoor and Martial Arts Games

References 

Palestine at the Asian Games
Asian
Nations at the 2018 Asian Games